Edward Byrom (13 June 1724 – 24 April 1773) was a prominent figure in 18th-century Manchester and served for a period as borough-reeve.

The oldest surviving son of John Byrom of the wealthy Byrom family, Edward Byrom co-founded the first bank in Manchester and ordered the construction of St John's Church in 1769. The church, demolished in 1931, was situated on Byrom Street, a street which was named after his family. He married Eleanora Halstead, who bore him four girls before her death in 1758: Ann Byrom (1751-1826), Elizabeth Byrom (1754-1754), Felicia Byrom (1755-1757) and Eleanora Byrom (1756-1838). His granddaughter was English philanthropist Eleanora Atherton.

References

1724 births
1773 deaths
English accountants
18th-century English people
History of Manchester